There is no single definition of an absolute scale. In statistics and measurement theory, it is simply a ratio scale in which the unit of measurement is fixed, and values are obtained by counting.  According to another definition it is a system of measurement that begins at a minimum, or zero point, and progresses in only one direction. Yet another definition tells us it is the count of the elements in a set, with its natural origin being zero, the empty set. Some sources tell us that even time can be measured in an absolute scale, proving year zero is measured from the beginning of the universe. How that is obtained precisely would be a matter of debate. The most accepted absolute scale is the Kelvin temperature scale, where absolute zero is the temperature at which molecular energy is at a minimum. Another absolute scale is the Rankine temperature scale. In general, an absolute scale differs from a relative scale in having some reference point that is not arbitrarily selected.

Features
An absolute scale differs from an arbitrary, or "relative", scale, which begins at some point selected by a person and can progress in both directions. An absolute scale begins at a natural minimum, leaving only one direction in which to progress.

An absolute scale can only be applied to measurements in which a true minimum is known to exist. Time, for example, which does not have a clearly known beginning, is measured on a relative scale, with an arbitrary zero-point such as the conventional date of the birth of Jesus (see Anno Domini) or the accession of an emperor. Temperature, on the other hand, has a known minimum, absolute zero (where volume of an ideal gas becomes zero), and therefore, can be measured either in absolute terms (e.g. kelvin), or relative to a reference temperature (e.g. degree Celsius).

Uses
Absolute scales are used when precise values are needed in comparison to a natural, unchanging zero point. Measurements of length, area and volume are inherently absolute, although measurements of distance are often based on an arbitrary starting point. Measurements of weight can be absolute, such as atomic weight, but more often they are measurements of the relationship between two masses, while measurements of speed are relative to an arbitrary reference frame. (Unlike many other measurements without a known, absolute minimum, speed has a known maximum and can be measured from a purely relative scale.) Absolute scales can be used for measuring a variety of things, from the flatness of an optical flat to neuroscientific tests.

References

Measurement
Metrology